Michael "Eppo" Eppelstun is an Australian professional bodyboarder who won the bodyboarding world championship in 1993. In winning the competition, he became the first Australian and the first non-Hawaiian to win the World title. Eppo helped develop two new moves in the bodyboarding world which ushered in whole new gymnastic approach to riding a bodyboard. First came the Air Roll Spin and shortly later the Blackflip.

References

Australian surfers
Living people
Bodyboarders
Year of birth missing (living people)